Mùn Chung is a commune (xã) and village of the Tuần Giáo District of Điện Biên Province, northwestern Vietnam. In 1999 it had a population of 4,608.
The Mùn Chung Scenic Caves on the hill of Loi Pom, at Huoi Loong village in the commune contains Buddha statues.

References

Communes of Điện Biên province
Populated places in Điện Biên province